Chimney Rock State Park is a North Carolina state park in Chimney Rock, Rutherford County, North Carolina in the United States.

The park features hiking trails for all skill levels, views of the Devil's Head balancing rock, and a  waterfall, Hickory Nut Falls. Its most notable feature is a  granite monolith named Chimney Rock, which is accessible by elevator and provides views of the park and surrounding countryside.

Early park development
In May 2005, the North Carolina General Assembly authorized the creation of the "Hickory Nut Gorge State Park." In August 2005 the Carolina Mountain Land Conservancy and The Nature Conservancy purchased a  tract of land south of Lake Lure known as "World's Edge" for $16 million with the intention of transferring the land as the first to be added to the new state park. From an overlook point, the land falls away to provide views of the Piedmont. The area provides habitat for rare flowers, diverse forest communities, endangered bats and salamanders, unique cave-dwelling invertebrates, and birds such as peregrine falcons and migratory neotropical species. Transfer of the World's Edge tract to state ownership was completed in 2006.

State acquisition of Chimney Rock Park
In 1902, Dr. Lucius B. Morse purchased  at Chimney Rock Mountain from Jerome Freeman, a North Carolina State Legislator and Land Speculator, including the Chimney and cliffs. Morse and his family owned and operated "Chimney Rock Park" as a privately managed park from 1902 to 2007. In 2006 the land was put up for sale. Many feared the park might fall into the hands of private developers, but the state and the Morse family completed a purchase agreement in early 2007.

In July 2007, the General Assembly renamed Hickory Nut Gorge State Park to Chimney Rock State Park.

Nearby state parks
The following state parks and state forests are within  of Chimney Rock State Park:
Caesars Head State Park, South Carolina
DuPont State Forest
Holmes Educational State Forest
Jones Gap State Park, South Carolina
Lake James State Park
Mount Mitchell State Park
Pisgah View State Park
South Mountains State Park

See also
 Hickory Nut Gorge State Trail

References

External links 
 
 Chimney Rock Attraction
 Chimney Rock State Park Master Plan
 Session Law 2005-26 established Hickory Nut Gorge State Park, which later was renamed Chimney Rock State Park.
 Session Law 2007-307 changed the name of Hickory Nut Gorge State Park to Chimney Rock State Park.

Landmarks in North Carolina
Protected areas of Rutherford County, North Carolina
State parks of North Carolina
State parks of the Appalachians
Protected areas established in 2005